In enzymology, a glycolipid 2-alpha-mannosyltransferase is an enzyme that catalyzes the chemical reaction in which an alpha-D-mannosyl residue is transferred from GDP-mannose to lipid-linked oligosaccharide, being attached by an alpha-1,2-D-mannosyl-D-mannose bond.

This enzyme belongs to the family of glycosyltransferases, specifically the hexosyltransferases.  The systematic name of this enzyme class is GDP-mannose:glycolipid 1,2-alpha-D-mannosyltransferase. Other names in common use include guanosine diphosphomannose-oligosaccharide-lipid, mannosyltransferase, GDP-mannose-oligosaccharide-lipid mannosyltransferase, and oligosaccharide-lipid mannosyltransferase.

Structural studies

References

 

EC 2.4.1
Enzymes of known structure